Paramita Satpathy (born 30 August 1965) is an Indian writer. Paramita is the daughter of Sahitya Akademi Award winner poet Pratibha Satpathy and Nityananda Satpathy.

Her first short-story was published in 1985 in 'Jhankar' magazine. Paramita, who has authored seven short-story collections, has been selected for the Sahitya Akademi Award 2016 for Odia. She has won the award for ‘Prapti’, a short-story collection she wrote in 2012.
Prapti was released in a compact disc (CD) in August 2015.
Many of her novels have also been translated in Hindi, English, Bengali, Telugu and Marathi languages.

Paramita who had joined Indian Revenue Service in 1989, is posted as the commissioner of the Income Tax department.

Writings 
Paramita, has seven short-story collections and a novel to her credit like- 
 Chandan ke Phool, 2015
 Narikabi O Anyamane, 2015  
 Prapti, 2012
 Intimate Pretence, 2010
 Kurei Fula, 2009
 Dur ke Pahad, 2007
 Antaranga Chhala, 2006
 Apathacharini, 2005
 Birala Rupaka, 2003
 Bhashakshara, 2000
 Bibidha Aswapna, 1997

Awards 
Kalinga Karubaki Award 2017, Kalinga Literary Festival
 Sahitya Akademi Award, 2016 
 Kadambini Galpa Samman, 2010 
 Seashore srujan Samman, 2010
 Amrutayan Galpa Puraskar
 Odisha Sahitya Akademi Award, 2006
 Bharatiya Bhasa Parishad Yuva Puraskar, 2003 
 Gangadhar Rath Foundation Award, 2002
 Bhubaneswar Book Fair Award, 2001

References

External links 
 Official website

1965 births
Living people
Women writers from Odisha
Recipients of the Sahitya Akademi Award in Odia
Odia-language writers
Indian Revenue Service officers
Novelists from Odisha
20th-century Indian novelists
21st-century Indian novelists
20th-century Indian women writers
21st-century Indian women writers